JCR may refer to:

Persons
 Jamal Campbell-Ryce, a Jamaican international footballer

Publications
 Journal of Chinese Religions
 Journal Citation Reports
 Journal of Conflict Resolution, an academic journal that publishes scholarly articles and book reviews dealing with international conflict and conflict resolution
 Journal of Consumer Research

Others
 Japan Credit Rating Agency, a Japanese financial services company
 Java Content Repository, the content repository API for Java programming language
 Jewish Cultural Reconstruction, Inc., 1947–1952
 Judicial Complaints Reviewer, reviews complaints regarding members of the Scottish judiciary
 Junior common room or junior combination room, a type of university common room
 Junta Coordinadora Revolucionaria (Revolutionary Coordinating Junta), 1970s urban guerrilla communist parties in South America
 Jeunesse communiste révolutionnaire, a French Trotskyist organisation founded after the dissolution of the Union of Communist Students